Hibbertia oxycraspedota is a species of flowering plant in the family Dilleniaceae and is endemic to New South Wales. It is a small shrub with linear to lance-shaped leaves and yellow flowers arranged singly on the ends of branchlets, with usually seven stamens in a single cluster on one side of two carpels.

Description
Flowering mainly occurs from August to October.

Taxonomy
Hibbertia oxycraspedota was first formally described in 2012 by Hellmut R. Toelken and R.T. Miller in the Journal of the Adelaide Botanic Gardens from specimens collected in 2005 in Heathcote National Park. The specific epithet (oxycraspedota) means "sharp-edged", referring to the leaves.

Distribution and habitat
This hibbertia grows in sandy soil on sandstone, often in moist places on the Central Coast of New South Wales.

See also
List of Hibbertia species

References

oxycraspedota
Flora of New South Wales
Plants described in 2012
Taxa named by Hellmut R. Toelken